Gomier is a village in the Roseaux municipality of the Corail Arrondissement, in the Grand'Anse department of Haiti.

Populated places in Grand'Anse (department)